Hans Kundt (28 February 1869, Neustrelitz, Mecklenburg-Strelitz – 30 August 1939, Lugano, Switzerland) was a German military officer from a family of military officers.  He was the primary military figure of Bolivia during the two decades preceding the Chaco War.

Beginnings and World War I
Kundt was born in 1869 in Mecklenburg-Strelitz, Germany, and was commissioned in 1888 (1889 Fähnrich).   In 1902 he served as captain of the Generalstab (General Headquarters) and later commanded a regiment on the Russian Front.   Kundt arrived in Bolivia in 1908, as head of a German military training mission.  He enjoyed an excellent relationship with the Bolivians and acquired a reputation as a competent peacetime administrator and troop trainer.  In 1911, he began the reorganisation of the Bolivian Army, following the pattern of the Prussian Army.

At the start of First World War, Kundt returned to Germany.   In 1914 he was commander of a regiment on the Eastern Front and achieved the rank of Generalleutnant.  He served as chief of staff  on the corps level, and as a brigade commander.  After the First World War, Kundt retired at the rank of colonel, although he was conferred the rank of general upon retiring.

In Bolivia 
Following the First World War, Kundt again returned to Bolivia.  There he was offered the posts of Chief of Staff of the Army, and of Minister of War, with the rank of general.  Kundt accepted the posts and headed the program of rearming Bolivia during the 1920s, and the planning to occupy the Chaco.  He adopted Bolivian citizenship and entered the army as a general.  In this post he continued the reorganisation he had begun in 1911, and became very popular as – unlike much of the Bolivian officer corps – he was concerned with the well-being of the troops.  In 1923 he was named Minister of War.  After the fall of president Hernando Siles Reyes in a coup in 1930, Kundt was exiled for having collaborated with that administration.

Chaco War 
Only two years later, Kundt was brought back to direct the Bolivian Army against Paraguay in the Chaco War, and was appointed both Commander in Chief and Minister of War.  In that role, Kundt was instrumental in Bolivia's purchase of a large amount of modern arms and equipment, including an insistence that Bolivia include a quantity of light tanks and armored vehicles in the order. Kundt later boasted to an American reporter that 'if the Paraguayans ever dare to take up the Chaco issue again, I shall make a military walkover right over to their capital of Asunción, and settle the matter once and for all'.

However, Kundt's directing of the Bolivian military campaign was problematic.  Bolivia's tanks and tankettes proved almost useless in navigating the thick scrub and quebracho of the Gran Chaco, and were easily isolated and destroyed or seized by Paraguyan infantry using grenades and mortars. By 1934, Paraguay was employing a large number of captured Bolivian Army automatic weapons and trucks against their former owners. The loss of the tanks forced the Bolivian government to purchase a quantity of bipod-mounted Oerlikon SSG36 anti-tank rifles to deal with their potential recovery and use by the Paraguayan army.

The valuable aerial reconnaissance produced by Bolivia's superior air force (Bolivian pilots spotted several approaching Paraguayan encirclements of Bolivian forces) was largely ignored by Kundt, who dismissed the reports as exaggerations by overzealous airmen. Kundt repeatedly eschewed flanking maneuvers for futile frontal infantry assaults against well-defended Paraguayan positions using machine guns with interlocking fire zones.  Kundt also proved a failure at logistics, and large Bolivian forces were regularly forced to surrender for lack of water to their opponents. His refusal to develop an effective intelligence service meant that the Bolivian Army could not track enemy movements.  Unit after unit of the Bolivian army were surrounded and destroyed.

After Bolivia's defeat in Campo Vía, Kundt was relieved of command on 12 December 1933 as Chief of Staff by Bolivian President Daniel Salamanca. Kundt left Bolivia and returned to Germany. Retiring to Switzerland in 1936, Kundt died in Lugano (Switzerland) on 30 August 1939 at age 70.

Evaluation 

Kundt displayed excellent qualities as an administrator and dedicated instructor, and was concerned for the well-being of his men. However, during World War I Kundt demonstrated a mediocre grasp of tactics, preferring frontal assaults in most situations.  Despite his knowledge of staff issues, he was not a good strategist.  Despite the Bolivian military's focus on the Chaco in the 1920s, Kundt never visited or familiarised himself with the region, and his concept of the war with Paraguay was essentially that of a triumphant, unopposed march across the region by Bolivian troops.

Kundt was reluctant to depend on his Bolivian officers (though many were quite capable), and preferred to supervise military operations directly.

Notes

External links
Paraguayan cartoon of Kundt
 

1869 births
1939 deaths
People from Neustrelitz
Bolivian generals
Foreign military officers of the Chaco War
German Army generals of World War I
German emigrants to Bolivia
People from Mecklenburg-Strelitz
Major generals of Prussia
People of the Chaco War
People from Lugano